El Amparo is a town located in Páez Municipality, Apure of Venezuela. It is located on the border with Colombia, on the banks of the Arauca River.

The Massacre of El Amparo took place near the town.

References

Populated places in Apure
Colombia–Venezuela border crossings
Massacre of El Amparo